Lowered Sails (Italian: Vele ammainate) is a 1931 Italian drama film directed by Anton Giulio Bragaglia and starring Dria Paola, Carlo Fontana and Umberto Guarracino.

The film's sets were designed by the art directors, Gastone Medin and Ivo Perilli. It was shot at the Cines Studios in Rome.

Cast
 Dria Paola as Aurora - la ragazza della taverna  
 Carlo Fontana as Il capitano di marina
 Umberto Guarracino as Il padrone della taverna
 Enrica Fantis
 Umberto Sacripante 
 Tullio Galvani
 Umberto Cocchi
 Amerigo Bomprezzi
 Renato Chiantoni 
 Renato Malavasi 
 Otty Noceti
 Giuseppe Pierozzi 
 Riccardo Rivaroli
 Idolo Tancredi

References

Bibliography 
 Moliterno, Gino. The A to Z of Italian Cinema. Scarecrow Press, 2009.

External links 
 

1931 films
1931 drama films
Italian drama films
1930s Italian-language films
Films directed by Anton Giulio Bragaglia
Cines Studios films
Italian black-and-white films
1930s Italian films